Tuomioja is a Finnish surname. It may refer to:

 Erkki Tuomioja (born 1946), Finnish politician
 Sakari Tuomioja (1911–1964), Finnish politician
 Walto Tuomioja (1888-1931), Finnish lawyer, journalist and politician

Finnish-language surnames
Surnames of Finnish origin